Giorgia Whigham is an American actress. She is best known for her roles as Kat in the first season of 13 Reasons Why, Amy Bendix in the second season of The Punisher, and Beth in the third season of Scream.

Life and career
Giorgia Whigham is the daughter of actor Shea Whigham and his wife Christine Whigham.

Giorgia Whigham had her first break in the acting world starring alongside Ellery Sprayberry in the 2016 short film Pinky.

Following her acting debut, she won roles on a variety of TV shows including Shameless, Son of Zorn, 13 Reasons Why, and The Orville.

On September 13, 2017, it was announced that Whigham would join the third season of the VH1 slasher television series Scream as a series regular. She starred in the role of Beth. The third season premiered on July 8, 2019.

On February 26, 2018, it was announced that Whigham would appear in the second season of Netflix's The Punisher.

In 2019, she co-starred in the film Saving Zoë, which was an adaptation to Alyson Noël’s bestselling young adult novel of the same title, starring alongside sisters Laura Marano and Vanessa Marano.

In 2017 and 2022, she guest-starred as Lysella on the first and third seasons of The Orville.

In 2022, she was cast as Blaire Bennett on the Peacock series Ted, the television adaptation of the hit movie.

Filmography

References

External links
 

Living people
21st-century American actresses
American film actresses
American television actresses
Year of birth missing (living people)